The 2016 Nippon Professional Baseball season is the 67th season since the NPB was reorganized in 1950.

Incidents
A gambling scandal involving members of the Yomiuri Giants was reported in October. Pitchers Satoshi Fukuda, Shoki Kasahara, and Ryuya Matsumoto were found to have bet on both NPB games and Major League Baseball games, as well as high school baseball.

Regular season standings

Climax Series

Note: In each league's stepladder playoff system (Climax Series), all games in that series are held at the higher seed's home stadium. The team with the higher regular-season standing also advanced if the round ended in a tie.

First stage

Central League

Pacific League

Final stage

Central League

Pacific League

Japan Series

League leaders

Central League

Pacific League

Attendances

See also
2016 KBO League season
2016 Major League Baseball season

References